Subhrajit Roy (born 16 July 1987) is an Indian first-class cricketer who plays for Tripura.

References

External links
 

1987 births
Living people
Indian cricketers
Tripura cricketers
Cricketers from Tripura
People from Gomati district